Larry Rapp (born February 20, 1948) is an American actor. He is known for his role in Once Upon a Time in America as Fat Moe.

Filmography

References

External links

1948 births
Living people
American male film actors
American male television actors
20th-century American male actors